Shehzad Ahmed (born 5 July 1991) is a Danish cricketer playing for the Denmark national cricket team and the 2008 and 2011 Danish champions Glostrup CC. Ahmed is a right-handed opening batsman and wicketkeeper.

Having represented Denmark at Under-15,U-17 & U-19 level, Ahmed made his full debut for national team in the 2011 Nordic Cup against Finland. He hit out 52 runs in their 99-runs victory over the Finland team.  Later that year, he was selected to play for Denmark in the European T20 Championship Division One which was held in Jersey and Guernsey. He played some important innings, especially in the crucial semifinal match against Guernsey, where he made 40 runs out of Denmark's initial 136 which sealed the victory and the ticket for next year's ICC World Twenty20 Qualifier.

In March 2012, Denmark took part in the World Twenty20 Qualifier in the United Arab Emirates, having qualified for the event by winning the European T20 Championship.  Ahmed was selected in Denmark's fourteen man squad for the qualifier, making his Twenty20 debut against Bermuda at the Sharjah Cricket Association Stadium.  He made four further appearances during the competition, the last of which came against Hong Kong, scoring a total of 38 runs at an average of 7.60, with a high score of 11.

In August 2012, he was selected in Denmark's fourteen-man squad for the World Cricket League Division Four in Malaysia.

In December 2012, he had a serious ACL injury in the left knee during practice, and was ruled out of the 2013 season. He underwent a reconstruction of the ACL in January 2013, and is currently doing a rehabilitation program.

References

External links
Shehzad Ahmed at ESPNcricinfo
Shehzad Ahmed at CricketArchive
Shehzad Ahmed injured at Cricket.dk

1991 births
Living people
Danish cricketers
Danish people of Pakistani descent